Euchrysops banyo, the Banyo Mountain Cupid, is a butterfly in the family Lycaenidae. It is found in Nigeria and Cameroon. The habitat consists of submontane grassland.

References

Butterflies described in 2001
Euchrysops